"Forever" is a song by rappers Drake, Kanye West, Lil Wayne, and Eminem. Written alongside producer Boi-1da, the song was originally released as the third single from the soundtrack to LeBron James's More than a Game documentary and was placed on the Refill re-release of Eminem's album Relapse. Eminem performed his verse of the song at the American Music Awards of 2009. Drake performed the song with Lil Wayne, Eminem, and Travis Barker at the 52nd Annual Grammy Awards. A demo version of the song was leaked in mid-2008.

Background
The track was produced by Boi-1da and originally used by Kardinal Offishall featuring Rock City in early 2008, as "Bring It Back". Kardinal did not use the song for his album and it was later re-sold to Drake, who released it in late 2008 as "I Want This Forever" featuring Lil Wayne and Kidd Kidd. In an interview, Kardinal stated that his version was a leaked demo which was supposed to appear on his album Not 4 Sale, as well as a soundtrack. The 2009 version of "Forever" features Kanye West, Lil Wayne, and Eminem. Rapper Jay-Z called it the best posse cut of the decade. The song title is derived from the last line of the chorus; I want this shit forever man.

The song gained a lot of attention from Eminem fans especially due to the story behind the song. According to an interview with Kanye West talking about the song, he said, "When I heard Eminem's verse on the Drake shit, I went back and rewrote my shit for two days. I cancelled appointments to rewrite!" Similarly, Lil Wayne rewrote his verse after hearing Eminem's. In response to this, Eminem told Complex, "Everybody approached the beat different […] For some reason, I felt the beat was a double-time beat, so I rapped faster."

Music video
The music video was shot in Fontainebleau Hotel in Miami, Florida, in early September 2009. However, Eminem's part in the video was shot in Detroit due to scheduling conflicts and not being able to be in Miami. The music video was shot and directed by Hype Williams. It premiered on September 22, 2009 on BET's musical program 106 & Park. LeBron James appears in the opening of the music video in the back seat of a Maybach playing online poker on PokerStars on his customized Beats by Dr. Dre's laptop. Throughout the video, there are clips and pictures from the documentary about James, More than a Game, and of him as a child playing basketball. Also The Alchemist, Trick-Trick, Mr. Porter, Swifty McVay, Kuniva, Bizarre and Slaughterhouse all make cameo appearances in Eminem's verse of the video behind him as he raps his verse. Birdman makes a cameo appearances in the video on Lil Wayne's verse, sitting next to him in the VIP section of the club. The music video was produced alongside the video for "Money to Blow".

Critical reception
Jason Thurston of Allmusic.com marked the song as one of the standout tracks of the album, writing: "The record hits a high point early on the six-minute epic 'Forever,' a convention of rap's wordsmiths as Kanye West, Drake, Lil Wayne, and Eminem pass the baton over a dark, soulful, slightly mournful beat, separated by an echoing modern R&B Auto-Tune hook." Stephen Thomas Erlewine of Allmusic.com also highlighted the song, and commented: "['Forever'] is none too coincidentally the one track in the entirety of Eminem's 2009 comeback that feels utterly modern." Entertainment Weekly was positive: "Those who frequent hip-hop blogs will already be acquainted with the strongest material, like Drake's Forever — where the rookie teams with all-stars Lil Wayne, Kanye West, and Eminem" and it was also on Download This list.

Chart performance
"Forever" entered the U.S. Billboard Hot R&B/Hip-Hop Songs at number fifty-eight on September 3, 2009, peaking at #2. The song became the most downloaded song for the week ending September 15, 2009. On the week of September 24, the song debuted at #8 on the Billboard Hot 100, making it Drake's highest debut on the chart at the time as well as his second top-ten single. it also topped the rap songs chart making it Drake's second number one on that chart. It was the tenth consecutive top 40 single for Eminem.  The song has sold 3,265,000 digital copies in the US as of April 2013, becoming Drake's first 3 million-seller.

"Forever" failed to enter the Top 40 on the UK Singles Chart, but did manage to peak at number 43 after strong downloads. The song then began to drop out of the UK Singles Chart, but on January 10, 2010, "Forever" climbed 7 places from number 49 to 42, marking its highest peak to date. "Forever" entered the Irish Singles Chart, reaching a current peak of number 41.

Awards and nominations

Track listing
Digital download

Charts

Weekly charts

Year-end charts

Certifications

References

External links
 

2009 singles
Drake (musician) songs
Kanye West songs
Eminem songs
Lil Wayne songs
Song recordings produced by Boi-1da
Songs written by Eminem
Songs written by Kanye West
Songs written by Lil Wayne
Songs written by Drake (musician)
2009 songs
Songs written by Boi-1da
Posse cuts
Music videos directed by Hype Williams
Universal Motown Records singles
Young Money Entertainment singles
Cash Money Records singles